The Makara River refers to one of the following rivers in New Zealand.

 Makara River (Chatham Islands), in the Chatham Islands
 Mākara River (Wellington), part of the Ruamahanga River system

See also 
 Makara (disambiguation)